Conus paulkersteni is a species of sea snail, a marine gastropod mollusk in the family Conidae, the cone snails and their allies.

Like all species within the genus Conus, these snails are predatory and venomous. They are capable of "stinging" humans, therefore live ones should be handled carefully or not at all.

Distribution
This marine species occurs off Vietnam.

Description

References

 Thach N.N. (2017). New shells of Southeast Asia. Sea shells & Land snails. 48HrBooks Company. 128 pp.  page(s): 27, figs 287–293
 Thach N.N. (2017). Three new species of Amphidromus Albers, 1850 (Gastropda: Camaenidae) from Vietnam, and Presentation of Conus (Rhizoconus) paulkersteni, nom. nov. pro Conus kersteni Thach, 2017 non-Tenorio, Afonso & Rolán, 2008. The Festivus. 49(4): 296–300.

External links

paulkersteni
Gastropods described in 2017